Durovo is a rural locality (a village) in Vereshchaginsky District, Perm Krai, Russia. The population was 44 as of 2010.

Geography 
Durovo is located 21 km north of Vereshchagino (the district's administrative centre) by road. Zakharyata is the nearest rural locality.

References 

Rural localities in Vereshchaginsky District